Al-Turbah is a sub-district located in al-Sabrah District, Ibb Governorate, Yemen. Al-Turbah had a population of 4638 according to the 2004 census.

References 

Sub-districts in As Sabrah District